Explosive cyclogenesis (also referred to as a weather bomb, meteorological bomb, explosive development, bomb cyclone, or bombogenesis) is the rapid deepening of an extratropical cyclonic low-pressure area. The change in pressure needed to classify something as explosive cyclogenesis is latitude dependent. This is a predominantly maritime, winter event, but also occurs in continental settings. This process is the extratropical equivalent of the tropical rapid deepening. Even though only a minority of bomb cyclones become this strong, some weaker ones can also cause significant damage.

History
In the 1940s and 1950s, meteorologists at the Bergen School of Meteorology began informally calling some storms that grew over the sea "bombs" because they developed with a great ferocity rarely seen over land.

By the 1970s, the terms "explosive cyclogenesis" and even "meteorological bombs" were being used by MIT professor Fred Sanders (building on work from the 1950s by Tor Bergeron), who brought the term into common usage in a 1980 article in the Monthly Weather Review. In 1980, Sanders and his colleague John Gyakum defined a "bomb" as an extratropical cyclone that deepens by at least  mb in 24 hours, where  represents latitude. This is based on the definition, standardised by Bergeron, for explosive development of a cyclone at 60°N as deepening by 24 mb in 24 hours. Sanders and Gyakum noted that an equivalent intensification is dependent on latitude: at the poles this would be a drop in pressure of 28 mb/24 hours, while at 25 degrees latitude it would be only 12 mb/24 hours. All these rates qualify for what Sanders and Gyakum called "1 bergeron". Sanders' and Gyakum's 1980 definition, which is used in the American Meteorological Society's Glossary of Meteorology, said that the "bomb" was "predominantly" a "maritime, cold season event".

In October 2010, an unusual weather system that reached the strength of a Category 3 hurricane and spanned 31 states in the United States and six Canadian provinces, underwent bombogenesis, according to Environment Canada. Severe weather warnings included "tornadoes, blustery blizzards, powerful gales, wind-driven rains, heavy snows and thunderstorms". The storm had the greatest impact in the Canadian province of Manitoba with the city of Winnipeg setting an "all-time record for its lowest-ever barometric pressure". 

In early 2014 in the North Atlantic, fourteen wind events out of twenty that had reached hurricane-force, underwent bombogenesis, the process that creates a bomb cyclone, according to National Oceanic and Atmospheric Administration (NOAA). NOAA said that bombogenesis "occurs when a midlatitude cyclone rapidly intensifies, dropping at least 24 millibars over 24 hours."

A bomb cyclone developed near the Great Lakes during the late December 2022 rapidly intensifying North American winter storm, when large, frigid, polar air masses from the polar vortex, propelled by high-pressure systems in Canada, met with the low-pressure mass of very warm air, resulting in a sharp and rapid drop in atmospheric pressure. It reached the criteria to be classified as bombogenesis when the atmospheric pressure dropped 24 millibars within 24 hours. As warm air was drawn into the storm, the winds got stronger, and air pressure and temperatures fell rapidly. The US National Weather Service reported a drop in temperature of 26 degrees in Montana in three minutes on December 24. The storm hit "large swaths" of North America leaving 55 fatalities in the United States and four in Canada. Strong winds and blizzard-like conditions intensified in the Northern Plains. With no Canadian province and territory spared , there was a total of 425 emergency weather warnings on December 24an "almost unprecedented number". The storm in the United States was described as "historic" by the NPR. It affected about 60% of the population, and resulted in the issuance of "one of the greatest extents of winter weather warnings and advisories ever". At its peak on December 24, 1.5 million households in the United States and 500,000 in Canada were without electricity.

In the last week of December 2022 through the first week of January 2023, a bomb cyclone hit the American West Coast, leading to the death of at least two people in California.

Formation
Baroclinic instability has been cited as one of the principal mechanisms for the development of most explosively deepening cyclones. However, the relative roles of baroclinic and diabatic processes in explosive deepening of extratropical cyclones have been subject to debate (citing case studies) for a long time. Other factors include the relative position of a 500-hPa trough and thickness patterns, deep tropospheric frontogenetic processes which happen both upstream and downstream of the surface low, the influence of air–sea interaction, and latent heat release.

Regions and motion

The four most active regions where extratropical explosive cyclogenesis occurs in the world are the Northwest Pacific, the North Atlantic, the Southwest Pacific, and the South Atlantic.

In the Northern Hemisphere the maximum frequency of explosively deepening cyclones is found within or to the north of the Atlantic Gulf Stream and Kuroshio Current in the western Pacific, and in the Southern Hemisphere it is found with Australian east coast lows above the East Australian Current, which shows the importance of air-sea interaction in initiating and rapidly developing extratropical cyclones.

Explosively deepening cyclones south of 50°S often show equator-ward movement, in contrast with the poleward motion of most Northern Hemisphere bombs. Over the year, 45 cyclones on average in the Northern Hemisphere and 26 in the Southern Hemisphere develop explosively, mostly in the respective hemisphere's winter time. Less seasonality has been noticed in bomb cyclogenesis occurrences in the Southern Hemisphere.

Other uses of "weather bomb"
The term "weather bomb" is popularly used in New Zealand to describe dramatic or destructive weather events. Rarely are the events actual instances of explosive cyclogenesis, as the rapid deepening of low pressure areas is rare around New Zealand. This use of "bomb" may lead to confusion with the more strictly defined meteorological term. In Japan, the term  is used both academically and commonly to refer to an extratropical cyclone which meets the meteorological "bomb" conditions.

The term "bomb" may be somewhat controversial. When European researchers protested that it was a rather warlike term, Fred Sanders, the coauthor of the paper which introduced the meteorological usage quipped: "So why are you using the term 'front'?".

See also

 Cyclogenesis, extratropical cyclones 
 Extratropical cyclone, formation
 Notable non-tropical pressures over the North Atlantic
 Superstorm

References

External links

 "What is a weather 'bomb'?"—BBC Weather
 Bomb Cyclone Data of the Northwest Pacific Ocean 
 Lorenz Energy Cycle - Linking Weather and Climate (MET 6155)

Extratropical cyclones
Synoptic meteorology and weather